Sweden competed at the 1980 Winter Olympics in Lake Placid, United States.

Medalists

Alpine skiing

Men

Women

Biathlon

Men

Men's 4 x 7.5 km relay

 1 A penalty loop of 150 metres had to be skied per missed target.
 2 One minute added per close miss (a hit in the outer ring), two minutes added per complete miss.

Bobsleigh

Cross-country skiing

Men

Men's 4 × 10 km relay

Women

Women's 4 × 5 km relay

Figure skating

Men

Ice hockey

Summary

First round - Blue Division

Final round
The top two teams from each group play the top two teams from the other group once. Points from previous games against their own group carry over, excluding teams who failed to make the medal round.

Carried over group match:
  Sweden 2–2 USA 
Team roster
Pelle Lindbergh
William Löfqvist
Sture Andersson
Jan Eriksson
Thomas Eriksson
Tomas Jonsson
Tommy Samuelsson
Mats Waltin
Ulf Weinstock
Bo Berglund
Håkan Eriksson
Leif Holmgren
Bengt Lundholm
Per Lundqvist
Harald Lückner
Lars Molin
Lennart Norberg
Mats Näslund
Dan Söderström
Mats Åhlberg
Head coach: Tommy Sandlin

Luge

Men

(Men's) Doubles

Women

Ski jumping

Speed skating

Men

Women

References
 Olympic Winter Games 1980, full results by sports-reference.com

Nations at the 1980 Winter Olympics
1980
Winter Olympics